The 1959–60 season was the 52nd year of football played by Dundee United, and covers the period from 1 July 1959 to 30 June 1960. United finished in second place in the Second Division and therefore promoted to the First Division.

Match results
Dundee United played a total of 44 competitive matches during the 1959–60 season.

Legend

All results are written with Dundee United's score first.
Own goals in italics

Second Division

Scottish Cup

League Cup

See also
 1959–60 in Scottish football

References

Dundee United F.C. seasons
Dundee United